

Group A

Head coach:

Head coach:

Head coach: Carlos Queiroz

Head coach:

Group B

Head coach:

Head coach:

Head coach:Wiktor Stasiuk

Head coach:

Group C

Head coach:

Head coach:

Head coach:

Head coach:

Group D

Head coach:

Head coach:

Head coach:

Head coach: Nenad Starovlah

Footnotes

UEFA European Under-17 Championship squads